Minx was a monthly UK magazine published by EMAP between October 1996 and July 2000. The magazine was based in London. At the time of its closure, its circulation was 120,000 copies a month.

References

1996 establishments in the United Kingdom
2000 disestablishments in the United Kingdom
Monthly magazines published in the United Kingdom
Defunct women's magazines published in the United Kingdom
Magazines published in London
Magazines established in 1996
Magazines disestablished in 2000